Ritika Shrotri is an Indian actress from Pune, Maharashtra. She predominantly appears in Marathi films. She has passed SSC exam from SPM English School, Sadashiv Peth, Pune and is now attending S P college pune.

Career
She started her career as a child actor and appeared in the serial Guntata Hriday He with Mrinal Kulkarni, Pallavi Subhash, Sandeep Kulkarni  in the role of Devi and in the film Prem Mhanje Prem Mhanje Prem Asta directed By Mrinal Kulkarni in the role of Ashu. In 2012, she appeared in Dabba Gul and Be dune 10 TV series. She made her Marathi film debut as an Lead Actress in Marathi Movie Slambook which is released in August 2015 with Dilip Prabhavalkar, Kushal Badrike, Usha Nadkarni, Shantanau Ragnekar. She also had a role in Marathi short film Tya Ratri. In 2017, Shrotri performed the role of Grace in the Super-hit Marathi feature film Boyz produced by Avadhoot Gupte playing an item number. After that, she appeared in Bucket List with Madhuri Dixit, Sumeet Raghavan which was released in 2018.

Filmography

Television

References

Living people
2000 births